The Charleville Times was a newspaper published in Charleville, Queensland, Australia, from 25 December 1883.

History
The Charleville Times was printed and published by Richard Boyd Echlin for the Charleville times Printing Co. and was first published on 25 December 1883. In 1961 it absorbed the Maranoa News published in Mitchell. Later it became the Western Times.

Digitisation 
The paper has been digitised as part of the Australian Newspapers Digitisation Program  of the National Library of Australia.

See also
 List of newspapers in Australia

References

External links
 

Defunct newspapers published in Queensland
1883 establishments in Australia
Publications established in 1883
Charleville, Queensland